Maksym Alentynovych Morozov (born 28 September 1978) is a retired Ukrainian footballer.

References

External links
 

1978 births
Living people
Ukrainian footballers
Association football midfielders
Ukrainian expatriate footballers
Expatriate footballers in Russia
Expatriate footballers in Belarus
Expatriate footballers in Armenia
Expatriate footballers in Lithuania
Armenian Premier League players
FC Okean Kerch players
FC Shakhtar-2 Donetsk players
PFC Sumy players
FC Metallurg Lipetsk players
FC Yenisey Krasnoyarsk players
FC Salyut Belgorod players
FC Fakel Voronezh players
FC Darida Minsk Raion players
FC Mika players
FK Atlantas players
FC Novokuznetsk players